Villers-sur-Trie is a former commune in the Oise department in northern France. On 1 January 2018, it was merged into the commune of Trie-Château.

See also
 Communes of the Oise department

References

Former communes of Oise
Populated places disestablished in 2018